Caroli may refer tà
Caroli (surname)
Caroli disease of bile ducts
Caroli Group, a company based in Monaco
Caroli Church, Malmö in Sweden
Caroli church, Borås in Sweden
USS Cor Caroli (AK-91), American cargo ship